Tris(o-tolyl)phosphine is an organophosphorus compound with the formula P(C6H4CH3)3. It is a white, water-insoluble solid that is soluble in organic solvents.  In solution it slowly converts to the phosphine oxide.  As a phosphine ligand, it has a wide cone angle of 194°. Consequently, it tends to cyclometalate when treated with metal halides and metal acetates. Complexes of this ligand are common in homogeneous catalysis.

See also
Triphenylphosphine

References

Tertiary phosphines
2-Tolyl compounds